Joan Weiner is an American philosopher and professor emerita of philosophy at Indiana University Bloomington, known for her books on Gottlob Frege.

Education and career
Weiner majored in mathematics at the University of Michigan, graduating with high distinction and honors in 1975. She completed a Ph.D. in philosophy at Harvard University in 1982.

She became an assistant professor of philosophy at the University of Wisconsin–Madison in 1981, with terms as a visiting faculty member at the University of Pennsylvania and a postdoctoral researcher at the University of Pittsburgh. She was promoted to associate professor at the University of Wisconsin in 1988 and full professor in 1997, while also earning a master's degree in biostatistics there in 1993. In 2002 she moved to Indiana University Bloomington, and in 2019 she retired as a professor emerita.

Books
Weiner is the author of:
Frege in Perspective (Cornell University Press, 1990)
Frege (Past Masters, Oxford University Press, 1999), revised and expanded as Frege Explained: From Arithmetic To Analytic Philosophy (Open Court Press, 2004)
Taking Frege At His Word (Oxford University Press, 2020)

Recognition
Weiner was named a Guggenheim Fellow in 2000.

References

Further reading

Year of birth missing (living people)
Living people
American women philosophers
University of Michigan alumni
Harvard Graduate School of Arts and Sciences alumni
University of Wisconsin–Madison alumni
University of Wisconsin–Madison faculty
Indiana University Bloomington faculty
21st-century American women